Gary Ronnie Stewart (May 28, 1944 – December 16, 2003) was an American musician and songwriter, known for his distinctive vibrato voice and his outlaw country sound influenced by southern rock. At the height of his popularity in the mid-1970s, Time magazine described him as the "king of honkytonk." He had a series of country chart hits from the mid- to late 1970s, the biggest of which was "She's Actin' Single (I'm Drinkin' Doubles)", which topped the U.S. country singles chart in 1975.

On December 16, 2003, Stewart died of a self-inflicted gunshot wound, one month after the death of his wife.

Early life and career 
Stewart was born in Jenkins, Kentucky, on May 28, 1944, the son of George and Georgia Stewart. He was named after the actor Gary Cooper.  In 1959 his father, a coal miner, sustained an injury while working in the mines, and shortly afterwards the family moved to Fort Pierce, a city on Florida's Atlantic coast.

Learning guitar and piano, Stewart began touring with local bands and writing songs in his teens.  He married Mary Lou Taylor, who was more than three years his senior, at age seventeen and began working days in an airplane factory.  He still played in rock and country bands at night.  While playing in an Okeechobee, Florida, honky-tonk known as the Wagon Wheel, Stewart met country singer Mel Tillis, who advised Stewart to travel to Nashville to pitch his songs.  He recorded a few songs for the small Cory label in 1964 and began co-writing songs with local policeman Bill Eldridge.  Stewart and Eldridge wrote Stonewall Jackson's 1965 country hit, "Poor Red Georgia Dirt". Signed to the Kapp label in 1968, Stewart made several unsuccessful recordings but several songwriting successes followed, for artists like Billy Walker ("She Goes Walking Through My Mind", "Traces of a Woman", "It's Time to Love Her"), Cal Smith ("You Can't Housebreak a Tomcat", "It Takes Me All Night Long"), and Nat Stuckey ("Sweet Thang And Cisco"). He even played piano for a time in Charley Pride's band the Pridesmen, and can be heard on Pride's live In Person double-album. Disappointed with Music Row, however, he soon returned to Florida and resumed playing countrified rock 'n' roll in local clubs and bars.  In 1970 Motown Records, hoping to get Nashville artists to record their songs, paid Stewart $30 to record countrified demos of "Baby I Need Your Loving", "Yester-Me, Yester-You, Yesterday", and "I Can't Help Myself (Sugar Pie Honey Bunch)".

Peak of career 

Stewart was dropped from Kapp and then from Decca, but a series of demo tapes, including the countrified Motown tunes, found their way into the hands of producer Roy Dea, who convinced Jerry Bradley to sign Stewart to RCA Records.  He returned to Nashville in 1973 and recorded a cover version of "Ramblin' Man" by the Allman Brothers, both of whom were Stewart's personal friends. It charted at only #63 on the country chart, but his follow-up, 1974's "Drinkin' Thing" became a top ten hit. His album Out of Hand was released in early 1975. "Out of Hand", the title cut, became a #4 country hit and was followed by the #1 hit "She's Actin' Single (I'm Drinkin' Doubles)".

The album Out of Hand, which climbed to #6 on the Billboard country album chart, has since become one of the most critically lauded country albums of the 1970s. Village Voice critic Robert Christgau gave the album an A− saying that it "was the best regular issue country LP I've heard in about five years." Rolling Stone gave it high praise as well, stating that, "With practitioners like Stewart around, honky-tonk—and rockabilly—may not be dead yet." Thom Jurek of AllMusic later gave the album five of five stars and stated that a "strong case could be made for Out of Hand as one of the Top 100 country records of all time. It might be in this writer's Top Ten!" Country music critic Bill Malone called Out of Hand "one of the greatest honky-tonk country albums ever recorded."

Later in 1975, MCA released Stewart's old Kapp material scoring a #15 hit with the single "You're Not the Woman You Use to Be".  For the rest of the 1970s Stewart played the honky tonks with his road band, The Honky Tonk Liberation Army, and recorded similar albums with modest success for RCA: 1976's Steppin' Out; 1977's Your Place or Mine (which featured guest artists Nicolette Larson, Emmylou Harris, and Rodney Crowell); and 1978's Little Junior. These albums spawned several hit singles, including: "Flat Natural Born Good-Timin' Man", "In Some Room Above the Street", "Single Again", "Your Place or Mine", "Quits", and "Whiskey Trip". His 1977 ode to marital distress entitled "Ten Years of This", from the album Your Place or Mine, was a favorite of Bob Dylan and a #16 hit. Dylan noted his admiration of Stewart in a 1978 interview with Playboy.

Later career and death
Though his late 1970s albums were well received by critics and his core fans, Stewart never established a large rapport with the general music audience. He was often labeled as "too country" for rock listeners and "too rock" for country fans. In 1980, he released the Chips Moman-produced Cactus and a Rose which featured Southern rockers Gregg Allman, Dickey Betts, Mike Lawler, and Bonnie Bramlett. It did not garner much airplay and RCA teamed Stewart up with songwriter Dean Dillon for a pair of duet records. Soon after, Stewart returned to Florida, where alcoholism and drug use kept him from recording for much of the 1980s. His son, Gary Joseph Stewart, committed suicide late in the decade as well. Stewart signed with the HighTone label in 1988 and recorded three albums over the next five years. These albums included fan favorites like the minor hit "An Empty Glass (That's the Way the Day Ends)" (written by Stewart and Dillon), "Let's Go Jukin'" (written by Stewart and Betts), and "Brand New Whiskey" (written by Stewart and his wife).

Stewart continued to tour through the 1990s, playing venues such as Fort Worth's Billy Bob's Texas several times a year. During this time, Bob Dylan, while touring with Tom Petty in Florida, drove out of his way to meet Stewart, "confessing that he'd played Stewart's ode to marital malaise 'Ten Years of This' over and over, the record casting a spell over him." In 2003, Stewart released Live at Billy Bob's Texas, his first album in ten years and his first-ever live album. Reviewers at Allmusic gave it good marks.

On November 26, 2003, the day before Thanksgiving, his wife of nearly 43 years, Mary Lou, died of pneumonia. Stewart, who had been scheduled to play Billy Bob's three days later, canceled his concert appearances. His friends later told reporters that he was extremely despondent after Mary Lou's death. On December 16, his daughter's boyfriend and Stewart's very close friend, Bill Hardman, visited his Fort Pierce, Florida, home to check on his welfare. They found Stewart dead of a self-inflicted gunshot wound to the neck.

Posthumous releases
In 2005, the Australia-based Raven Records released a CD containing Stewart's second and fourth albums: Steppin' Out and Little Junior, augmented with three previously unreleased bonus tracks from the RCA vaults. It was followed by a second Raven release containing Brotherly Love and Those Were the Days, expanded and augmented by rare bonus tracks which were previously unavailable on CD. Two songs from the era featured on this collection later became hits when recorded by George Strait.

Wounded Bird Records released a CD in 2010 which included the albums Cactus and a Rose and Collector's Series, a comprehensive greatest hits collection.  In 2010, UK-based Floating World Records reissued Stewart's albums from the late 1980s and early 1990s: Brand New, Battleground and I'm a Texan. Floating World purchased the entire back catalog from the now-defunct HighTone label.  In 2013, UK-based Morello Records released a CD containing Stewart's first and third albums: Out of Hand and Your Place or Mine.  In 2017, Morello released a CD containing Stewart's fifth and sixth albums: Gary and Cactus and a Rose.

For Record Store Day in 2018, the Delmore Recording Society label released a 45 rpm single called Mowtown containing Stewart’s versions of the Motown classics "Baby I Need Your Loving" and "Yester-Me, Yester-You, Yesterday".  Stewart recorded the tracks (and the unreleased "I Can't Help Myself (Sugar Pie Honey Bunch)") in 1970 when Motown Records wanted demos of their songs in a Nashville style, hoping to interest country music artists in recording Motown songs.  Stewart was paid $30 for the session.

In May 2020, the Austin-based band Mike and the Moonpies released Touch of You: The Lost Songs of Gary Stewart, an album of unreleased songs written or co-written by Stewart.  The band’s version of Stewart's "Smooth Shot of Whiskey", featuring Mark Wystrach of the band Midland was released as a single.

Discography

Albums

Compilation albums

Singles

References

Sources

External links
 [ Gary Stewart at] Allmusic
 Gary Stewart at CMT.com
 "Gary Stewart Kicks the Shit Off Your Shoes," Tom Hull's Old Rock Critic Writings, Tom Hull

1944 births
2003 suicides
People from Jenkins, Kentucky
American country singer-songwriters
Suicides by firearm in Florida
Country musicians from Kentucky
Musicians from Appalachia
20th-century American singers
Singer-songwriters from Kentucky